Douglas Perlman (born October 8, 1968) is the founder and CEO of Sports Media Advisors, a leading boutique advisory firm. Since the firm's inception in 2009, Perlman has worked on all its client engagements including matters on behalf of NFL, MLB, NASCAR, USTA, UFC, Hockey Canada, Little League, EA, Twitter, NextVR , and several private equity firms. Among other things, Sports Media Advisors and Perlman help sports properties optimize multi-platform content distribution strategies (including negotiating their primary media rights deals), develop and execute growth strategies for sports-related businesses, and perform diligence and deal support for investors considering media, technology, and/or sports-related opportunities.

Before founding SMA at the age of 40, Perlman had already established himself as a well-regarded leader in the industry, serving in senior roles at the NHL and IMG. Among other accolades, he had been named to the prestigious Sports Business Journal Forty Under 40 three times, earning a spot in their Hall of Fame.

Perlman began his career in 1995 as an attorney at Proskauer Rose, a global law firm with the nation's top sports practice. Shortly after joining the National Hockey League, a firm client, he recognized the promise of digital media and segued into a business role to establish the NHL's digital operations. At 32, the Sports Business Journal wrote that Perlman found “himself with more responsibility than anyone else his age at a major league sport and perhaps in the entire sports world.” He spent more than 10 years at the league, ultimately serving as Executive Vice President, Media and a member of Commissioner Gary Bettman’s senior management team. Following the NHL, Perlman was recruited by then-CEO Ted Forstmann to join IMG as the President of IMG Media, North America where he again oversaw all television and digital media businesses, reporting to Forstmann as a member of IMG's six-member global leadership team.

Perlman has been recognized by multiple industry publications as a leader in the businesses of sports, media, and technology, including being named one of the 100 Most Powerful People in Sports by the Sporting News. Perlman regularly appears on television and is often a featured speaker at industry and other events. He is also frequently asked to speak to students on college and university campuses.

SMA has come to be widely regarded as a top advisory firm in the space. The company has negotiated some of the sports industry's largest and most complex transactions, including more than $10 billion in total media rights fees.

Early and personal life

Doug Perlman was born in Baltimore, Maryland and attended Staples High School in Westport, Connecticut.  He is a graduate of Duke University where he received a B.A., cum laude, in Political Science in 1990, and of the University of Virginia School of Law where he received his J.D. in 1993.

Perlman currently resides in New Canaan, Connecticut with his wife, Lisa, and their three boys.

References

External links
 Sports Media Advisors Website
 Sports Business Journal Article May 2013
Forbes SportsMoney Show May 2019
Sports Business Journal 40 Under 40 Article May 2007
Forbes Article November 2019
Forbes SportsMoney Show September 2019
Business Wire Article December 2006
Sports Business Journal NASCAR Article August 2013
Sports Business Journal USTA Article May 2013

1968 births
Living people
American sports executives and administrators
Duke University Trinity College of Arts and Sciences alumni
University of Virginia School of Law alumni
People from Westport, Connecticut
American lawyers
People from New Canaan, Connecticut
Proskauer Rose people
Staples High School alumni
American chief executives